Pace Jefferson McConkie (born October 30 1960) is a civil rights lawyer in Annapolis, Maryland and a professor at Morgan State University in Baltimore, Maryland. He is the founder and director of Morgan State University's Robert M. Bell Center for Civil Rights in Education.

Early life and education
A native of Utah, McConkie is the son of attorney Oscar W. McConkie Jr. As a young man, McConkie served as a Mormon missionary for the Church of Jesus Christ of Latter-day Saints in New Zealand.

McConkie received his bachelor's degree from the University of Utah in Salt Lake City and his law degree from the William H. Bowen School of Law in Little Rock, Arkansas in 1987. After law school, he completed a two-year clerkship with Associate Chief Justice Richard C. Howe of the Utah Supreme Court.

Career
McConkie was assistant general counsel for the National Association for the Advancement of Colored People (NAACP) in Maryland.

McConkie has served as assistant attorney general of Maryland. In that capacity, he opposed the starting of an MBA program at Towson University that would compete against Morgan State University.

McConkie was president of the Annapolis Stake of The Church of Jesus Christ of Latter-day Saints.

Honors and awards
McConkie, who is white, is a recipient of the National Association for the Advancement of Colored People Attorney of the Year award in 1994.

References

External links
Church News, May 17, 2008

American leaders of the Church of Jesus Christ of Latter-day Saints
Maryland lawyers
American Mormon missionaries in New Zealand
American civil rights lawyers
1962 births
Living people
McConkie family
Morgan State University faculty
20th-century Mormon missionaries
William H. Bowen School of Law alumni
University of Arkansas at Little Rock alumni
University of Utah alumni
NAACP activists
Latter Day Saints from Maryland